Cadigan is an Irish surname. Notable people with the surname include:

Dave Cadigan (born 1965), American football player
George L. Cadigan (1910–2005), American Catholic bishop
Pat Cadigan (born 1953), American-born science fiction author

Anglicised Irish-language surnames